Elinor Middlemiss (née Elinor Allen; born 28 January 1967) is a former Scottish badminton player. At present she is working as Games team operations manager of Badminton Scotland Commonwealth games.

About 
Elinor Middlemiss is the wife of Kenny Middlemiss, another former Scottish badminton player. Elinor in her junior days won national junior championships for 5 times. She contested in 5 Commonwealth games between 1986 and 2002, winning two bronze medals in both individual (in 1998) and team event (in 2002). She played for her country in eight Uber Cups, eight European Team Championships and six World Championships and has the most international caps (136) and national titles (22) of any Scottish female badminton player. She was an advanced coach at equivalent of UKCC level 2 and has coached at World University Games and World University Championship level. At present she is appointed as Team Scotland Chief-de-Mission 2022 Commonwealth Games, having previously served as a deputy chief in 2014 and 2018 commonwealth games. She is the first woman ever to hold this post since the games began in 1930.

Achievements

Commonwealth Games 
Women's doubles

IBF World Grand Prix 
The World Badminton Grand Prix sanctioned by International Badminton Federation (IBF) from 1983 to 2006.

Women's doubles

Mixed doubles

IBF International 
Women's singles

Women's doubles

Mixed doubles

References

External links 

1967 births
Living people
20th-century Scottish women
Scottish female badminton players
Badminton players at the 1986 Commonwealth Games
Badminton players at the 1990 Commonwealth Games
Badminton players at the 1994 Commonwealth Games
Badminton players at the 1998 Commonwealth Games
Badminton players at the 2002 Commonwealth Games
Commonwealth Games bronze medallists for Scotland
Commonwealth Games medallists in badminton
Medallists at the 1998 Commonwealth Games
Medallists at the 2002 Commonwealth Games